The View, is a public golf course located near the community of Princeton, Newfoundland, Canada. The resort contains a 9-hole par 34 executive style course that measures 2250 yards from the blue tees and 1920 yards from the red tees.

See also
List of golf courses in Newfoundland and Labrador

References

External links
Official website

Golf clubs and courses in Newfoundland and Labrador